Jacqueline Jean "Jackie" Zoch (born June 8, 1949) is an American rower who competed in the 1976 Summer Olympics.

She was born in Madison, Wisconsin.

She competed in the 1976 Summer Olympics and was a crew member of the American boat which won the bronze medal in the eights event.

References 

 

1949 births
Living people
American female rowers
Rowers at the 1976 Summer Olympics
Olympic bronze medalists for the United States in rowing
Sportspeople from Madison, Wisconsin
Medalists at the 1976 Summer Olympics
21st-century American women